James Lauderdale was a member of the Wisconsin State Assembly.

Biography
Lauderdale was born on August 29, 1813 in Cambridge, New York. In 1842, he moved to what is now La Grange, Walworth County, Wisconsin. He died there on March 13, 1888. Lake Lauderdale in his hometown of Cambridge, New York, and Lauderdale, Wisconsin are named after him.

Career
Lauderdale was a member of the Assembly in 1853 and 1856. Additionally, he was a member of the Walworth County, Wisconsin county board.

References

People from Cambridge, New York
People from La Grange, Wisconsin
Members of the Wisconsin State Assembly
1813 births
1888 deaths
19th-century American politicians